TDF may refer to:

Rebel group
Tigray Defense Forces a rebel group situated in Tigray against the federal government.

Defense force 
 Ukraine Territorial Defense Forces

Technology 
 Tab delimited files, a tabular data file format
 Télé Distribution Française, a radio clock signal transmitter in France
 TenDRA Distribution Format, a design of abstract machine
 Tenofovir disoproxil fumarate, an antiretroviral drug
 Testis determining factor, a gene (or product thereof) that results in maleness
 Tire-derived fuel, recycled chipped tires burned for fuel
 Trusted Data Format, a data tagging and protection standard used both commercially and by the United States Intelligence Community and US Department of Defense

Arts
 The Dayton Family, an American horrorcore group
 Thessaloniki Documentary Festival, a documentary film festival affiliated with the International Thessaloniki Film Festival
 Totally Dysfunctional Family, known as TDF, the group pseudonym of Eric Clapton and other musicians for a one-off 1997 album 
 The Dhol Foundation, a dhol troupe from the UK

Other
 Tour de France, a prestigious cycle race in France
 TDF Group, a major French media and telecommunications conglomerate
 Tour de Future (Australia), the Commodore 64 software production group, see Notemaker
 Theatre Development Fund, a non-profit corporation dedicated to assisting the theatre industry in New York City
 Theoretical Domains Framework, an implementation tool for Behavioural change theories
 Total dietary fiber, the indigestible portion of food derived from plants
 TDF, ticker of Templeton Dragon Fund on the New York Stock Exchange, see Companies listed on the New York Stock Exchange (T)
 The Dawood Foundation, a Pakistani non-profit foundation founded by Ahmed Dawood
 The Document Foundation, a non-profit organization that promotes open-source document handling software, particularly LibreOffice
 Target date fund, a type of mutual fund whose asset mix becomes more conservative as the target date approaches

See also
 Tour de Force (disambiguation)